Malay civet cat is the common name of two species of Viverrid.

Malayan civet (Viverra tangalunga)
Binturong (Arctictis binturong)

References 

Viverrids
Mammal common names